Duftite is a relatively common arsenate mineral with the formula CuPb(AsO4)(OH), related to conichalcite. It is green and often forms botryoidal aggregates. It is a member of the adelite-descloizite Group, Conichalcite-Duftite Series. Duftite and conichalcite specimens from Tsumeb are commonly zoned in color and composition. Microprobe analyses and X-ray powder-diffraction studies indicate extensive substitution of Zn for Cu, and Ca for Pb in the duftite structure. This indicates a solid solution among conichalcite, CaCu(AsO4 )(OH), austinite, CaZn(AsO4)(OH) and duftite PbCu(AsO4)(OH), all of them belonging to the adelite group of arsenates. It was named after Mining Councilor G Duft, Director of the Otavi Mine and Railroad Company, Tsumeb, Namibia. The type locality is the Tsumeb Mine, Tsumeb, Otjikoto Region, Namibia.

Structure
The structure is composed of chains of edge-sharing CuO6 distorted octahedra parallel to the c axis. The chains are linked by AsO4 tetrahedra and Pb atoms.

Environment
Duftite is an uncommon product of weathered sulfide ore deposits. It is associated with azurite at the type locality, and with bayldonite, segnitite, agardite and gartrellite at the Central Cobar Mines, New South Wales, Australia, where some pseudomorphs of duftite after mimetite have also found. It occurs in association with olivenite, mottramite, azurite, malachite, wulfenite and calcite in the Tsumeb, Namibia deposit. It occurs with bayldonite, beudantite, mimetite and cerussite in the Cap Garonne mine, France.

Distribution
Reported from Argentina, Australia, Austria, Chile, the Czech Republic, France, Germany, Greece, Italy, Japan, Mexico, Namibia, Poland, Portugal, Russia, South Africa, Spain, Switzerland, the UK, the US and Zimbabwe.

References

Bibliography
Palache, P.; Berman H.; Frondel, C. (1960). "Dana's System of Mineralogy, Volume II: Halides, Nitrates, Borates, Carbonates, Sulfates, Phosphates, Arsenates, Tungstates, Molybdates, Etc. (Seventh Edition)" John Wiley and Sons, Inc., New York, pp. 810-811.

Arsenate minerals
Copper(II) minerals
Lead minerals
Orthorhombic minerals
Minerals in space group 19